Tanganyika is a 1954 American Technicolor action adventure film directed by Andre deToth and starring Van Heflin, Ruth Roman and Howard Duff. It was produced and distributed by Universal Pictures.

Plot synopsis
"Territory of East Africa 1903". In the British colonial region adjoining German East Africa (a portion of which was referenced as Tanganyika), tough American colonist John Gale (Van Heflin) is leading a safari to bring in escaped murderer Abel McCracken (Jeff Morrow), who is stirring up the (fictional) Nukumbi tribe and endangering Gale's holdings.

En route, he picks up four survivors of a Nukumbi raid: Dan Harder (Howard Duff), former teacher Peggy (Ruth Roman), and the two orphaned children of her brother who was killed in the raid. Harder is secretly McCracken's brother, while Gale’s motives however have nothing to do with justice or even the charms of Peggy; he hopes to stake a claim on a valuable piece of land. The Nukumbi are lying in wait and, eventually, Gale and McCracken meet in man-to-man combat.

Cast
Van Heflin as John Gale
Ruth Roman as Peggy
Howard Duffas Dan Harder McCracken
 Jeff Morrow as Abel McCracken
Joe Comadore as Andolo
Noreen Corcoran as Sally
Gregory Marshall as Andy
Naaman Brown as  Nukumbi Prisoner
Edward C. Short as Head Porter
 Murray Alper as 	Paul Duffy
 Jester Hairston as Singer

References

External links

Tanganyika at TV Guide (1987 write-up was originally published in The Motion Picture Guide)

1954 films
Universal Pictures films
1950s action adventure films
Films set in 1903
Films set in Kenya
Films directed by Andre DeToth
American action adventure films
1950s historical adventure films
American historical adventure films
1950s English-language films
1950s American films